Pablo Gastón Gerzel (born 5 January 2000) is an Argentine professional footballer who plays as a winger for Boca Juniors.

Club career
Gerzel played for Sarmiento from the age of four, up until his departure to Boca Juniors in 2010; having impressed at the Torneo Valesanito in Santa Fe; amid interest from Argentinos Juniors. He signed his first pro contract in September 2020, which preceded the winger appearing on Boca's bench five times during November and December; including for Copa Libertadores games with Libertad and Racing Club. On 12 February 2021, Gerzel was loaned to newly promoted Primera División side Platense. He debuted on 21 February against Argentinos Juniors in the Copa de la Liga Profesional; assisting Jorge Pereyra Díaz's winner.

International career
In April 2015, Gerzel was called up by the Argentina U15s. October 2016 saw Gerzel receive a call-up from the U17s.

Personal life
In September 2020, it was revealed that Gerzel had tested positive for COVID-19 amid the pandemic.

Career statistics
.

Notes

References

External links

2000 births
Living people
People from Resistencia, Chaco
Argentine footballers
Argentina youth international footballers
Association football forwards
Argentine Primera División players
Boca Juniors footballers
Club Atlético Platense footballers
Sportspeople from Chaco Province